Motorola Zine (pronounced "zeen") is a series of candybar mobile phones from Motorola, and is one of the series in the 4LTR line.

ZN5

The ZN5 was released in China in July 2008, and November 2008 for T-Mobile as the first 5.0 megapixel phone subsidized on a major US carrier. It is the first Motorola phone to include a 5.0MP camera and one of the few with Wi-Fi, though it does not support T-Mobile's Hotspot@Home service. It features Motorola's new ModeShift technology, first introduced with the Rokr E8. It has Kodak Imaging Technology, and Kodak Perfect Touch Technology which brightens photos and sharpen details.

It was being also released for sale in Central and Eastern Europe.

Specifications
The Motorola Zine ZN5 specifications are:

References

External links
 Official Motorola Zine ZN5 website
 Unofficial ZN5 modding website

Portable media players
Zine
Mobile phones introduced in 2008